The  is an electric multiple unit (EMU) train type in Japan, operated by the private railway operator Keio Corporation since 2001 on the Keio Line and its branches in Tokyo and Kanagawa Prefecture.

Variants
 9000 series: original 8-car sets (9701-9708)
 9030 series: 10-car sets (9730-9749) for use on Toei Shinjuku Line inter-running services from 2006

Operations

9000 series
The 9000 series 8-car sets are used mainly on the Keio Line, the Takao Line, and the Sagamihara Line. These sets are mainly used on Local services during daytime. They are also used on 10-car Special Express and Rapid trains. Sets are coupled to 2-car Keio 7000 series sets to form 10-car trains.

9030 series
The 9030 series 10-car sets are used primarily on inter-running services to and from the Toei Shinjuku Line.

Design
The front end design is based on the design of the Keio 5000 series. The body is made of stainless steel. While most of the sets were built at Nippon Sharyo, some were built at Tokyu Car Corporation. The front portion is made of steel painted ivory white.

The 9030 series sets differ from the earlier 8-car sets in having UV-cutting glass for the wide windows, eliminating the need for roller blinds, and having full-colour LED destination indicator panels.

Formations
As of 1 April 2013, the fleet consists of eight 8-car 9000 series sets and twenty 10-car 9030 series sets.

8-car 9000 series
The 8-car 9000 series sets (9701 to 9708) are formed as shown below, with four motored (M) cars and four non-powered trailer (T) cars, and with car 1 at the western end.

 Cars 3, 6, and 7 each have one single-arm pantograph.
 Cars 2 and 7 have a wheelchair space.

10-car 9030 series
The 10-car 9030 series sets (9730 to 9749) are formed as shown below, with five motored (M) cars and five non-powered trailer (T) cars, and with car 1 at the western end.

 Cars 2, 3, 6, 8, and 9 each have one single-arm pantograph.
 Cars 2, 5, 7, and 9 have a wheelchair space.

Interior
Passenger accommodation consists of longitudinal bench seating throughout. Priority seats are provided at the end of each car.

Special liveries 

From 1 November 2018, 9000 series set 9731 was wrapped in a pink livery incorporating several Sanrio characters, such as Hello Kitty.

References

External links

 Keio trainset details 
 Nippon Sharyo 9000 series information 
 Nippon Sharyo 9030 series information 

Electric multiple units of Japan
9000 series
Train-related introductions in 2001
Nippon Sharyo multiple units
1500 V DC multiple units of Japan
Tokyu Car multiple units